[[File:José Clemente Orozco - The Demagogue - Google Art Project.jpg|thumb|upright=1.2|José Clemente Orozco's painting The Demagogue]]

Demagogues overturn established norms of political conduct, or promise or threaten to do so.

Historian Reinhard Luthin defined demagogue as "...a politician skilled in oratory, flattery and invective; evasive in discussing vital issues; promising everything to everybody; appealing to the passions rather than the reason of the public; and arousing racial, religious, and class prejudices—a man whose lust for power without recourse to principle leads him to seek to become a master of the masses. He has for centuries practiced his profession of 'man of the people'. He is a product of a political tradition nearly as old as western civilization itself."

Demagogues have appeared in democracies since ancient Athens.  They exploit a fundamental weakness in democracy: because ultimate power is held by the people, it is possible for the people to give that power to someone who appeals to the lowest common denominator of a large segment of the population. Demagogues have usually advocated immediate, forceful action to address a crisis while accusing moderate and thoughtful opponents of weakness or disloyalty. Many demagogues elected to high executive office have unraveled constitutional limits on executive power and tried to convert their democracy into a dictatorship, sometimes successfully.

History and definition of the word

The word demagogue, originally meaning a leader of the common people, was first coined in ancient Greece with no negative connotation, but eventually came to mean a troublesome kind of leader who occasionally arose in Athenian democracy. Even though democracy gave power to the common people, elections still tended to favor the aristocratic class, which favored deliberation and decorum. Demagogues were a new kind of leader who emerged from the lower classes. Demagogues relentlessly advocated action, usually violent—immediately and without deliberation. Demagogues appealed directly to the emotions of the poor and uninformed, pursuing power, telling lies to stir up hysteria, exploiting crises to intensify popular support for their calls to immediate action and increased authority, and accusing moderate opponents of weakness or disloyalty to the nation.

Throughout its history, people have often used the word demagogue carelessly, as an "attack word" to disparage any leader whom the speaker thinks manipulative, pernicious, or bigoted. While there can be no precise delineation between demagogues and non-demagogues, since democratic leaders exist on a continuum from less to more demagogic, what distinguishes a demagogue can be defined independently of whether the speaker favors or opposes a certain political leader. What distinguishes a demagogue is how he or she gains or holds democratic power: by exciting the passions of the lower classes and less-educated people in a democracy toward rash or violent action, breaking established democratic institutions such as the rule of law. James Fenimore Cooper in 1838 identified four fundamental characteristics of demagogues:
 They present themselves as a man or woman of the common people, opposed to the elites.
 Their politics depends on a visceral connection with the people, which greatly exceeds ordinary political popularity.
 They manipulate this connection, and the raging popularity it affords, for their own benefit and ambition.
 They threaten or outright break established rules of conduct, institutions, and even the law.

The central feature of demagoguery is persuasion by means of passion, shutting down reasoned deliberation and consideration of alternatives.  While many politicians in a democracy make occasional small sacrifices of truth, subtlety, or long-term concerns to maintain popular support, demagogues do these things relentlessly and without self-restraint. Demagogues "pander to passion, prejudice, bigotry, and ignorance, rather than reason."

The enduring character of demagogues

Demagogues have arisen in democracies from Athens to the present day. Though most demagogues have unique, colorful personalities, their psychological tactics have remained the same throughout history (see below). Often considered the first demagogue, Cleon of Athens is remembered mainly for the brutality of his rule and his near destruction of Athenian democracy, resulting from his "common-man" appeal to disregard the moderate customs of the aristocratic elite. Modern demagogues include Adolf Hitler, Benito Mussolini, Huey Long, Father Coughlin, and Joseph McCarthy, all of whom built mass followings the same way that Cleon did: by exciting the passions of the mob against the moderate, thoughtful customs of the aristocratic elites of their times.  All, ancient and modern, meet Cooper's four criteria above: claiming to represent the common people, inciting intense passions among them, exploiting those reactions to take power, and breaking or at least threatening established rules of political conduct, though each in different ways.

Demagogues exploit a perennial weakness of democracies: the greater numbers, and hence votes, of the lower classes and less-educated people—the people most prone to be whipped up into a fury and led to catastrophic action by an orator skilled at fanning that kind of flame. Democracies are instituted to ensure freedom for all and popular control over government authority. Demagogues turn power deriving from popular support into a force that undermines the very freedoms and rule of law that democracies are made to protect. The Greek historian Polybius thought that democracies are inevitably undone by demagogues. He said that every democracy eventually decays into "a government of violence and the strong hand," leading to "tumultuous assemblies, massacres, banishments."

Whereas conventional wisdom sets up democracy and fascism as opposites, to ancient political theorists democracy had an innate tendency to lead to extreme populist government, and provided unscrupulous demagogues with the ideal opportunity to seize power. Indeed, Ivo Mosley argued that totalitarian regimes may well be the logical outcome of unfettered mass democracy.

Methods
Below are described a number of methods by which demagogues have manipulated and incited crowds throughout history. Not all demagogues use all of these methods, and no two demagogues use exactly the same methods to gain popularity and loyalty. Even ordinary politicians use some of these techniques from time to time; a politician who failed to stir emotions at all would have little hope of being elected. What these techniques have in common, and what distinguishes demagogues' use of them, is their consistent use to shut down reasoned deliberation by stirring up overwhelming passion.

Sometimes, a statesman, the kind of politician genuinely concerned with good policy, may need to resort to demagogic tactics in order to thwart a real demagogue—to "fight fire with fire". A real demagogue uses these tactics without restraint; a statesman, only to avert greater harm to the nation. In contrast to a demagogue, a statesman's ordinary rhetoric seeks "to calm rather than excite, to conciliate rather than divide, and to instruct rather than flatter."

Scapegoating
The most fundamental demagogic technique is scapegoating: blaming the in-group's troubles on an out-group, usually of a different ethnicity, religion, or social class. For example, McCarthy claimed that all of the problems of the U.S. resulted from "communist subversion." Denis Kearney blamed all the problems of laborers in California on Chinese immigrants. Hitler blamed Jews for Germany's defeat in World War I as well as the economic troubles that came afterward. This was central to his appeal: many people said that the only reason they liked Hitler was because he was against the Jews. Fixing blame on the Jews gave Hitler a way to intensify nationalism and unity.

The claims made about the scapegoated class are mostly the same regardless of the demagogue and regardless of the scapegoated class or the nature of the crisis that the demagogue is exploiting. "We" are the "true" Americans/Germans/Christians/etc., and "they", the Jews/bankers/communists/capitalists/unions/foreigners/elites/etc., have cheated "us" plain folk and are living in decadent luxury off riches that rightfully belong to "us". "They" are plotting to take over, are now rapidly taking power, or are already secretly running the country. "They" are subhuman, sexual perverts who will seduce or rape "our" daughters, and if "we" don't expel or exterminate "them" right away, doom is just around the corner.

Fearmongering
Many demagogues have risen to power by evoking fear in their audiences, to stir them to action and prevent deliberation. Fear of rape, for example, is easily evoked. "Pitchfork Ben" Tillman's rhetoric was most vivid when he was describing imaginary scenes in which white women were raped by black men lurking by the side of the road. He depicted black men as having an innate "character weakness" consisting of a fondness for raping white women. Tillman was elected governor of South Carolina in 1890, and elected senator repeatedly from 1895 to 1918.

Lying
While any politician needs to point out dangers to the people and criticize opponents' policies, demagogues choose their words for emotional effect on the audience, usually without regard for factual truth or the real severity of the danger. Some demagogues are opportunistic, monitoring the people and saying whatever currently will generate the most "heat". Other demagogues may themselves be so ignorant or prejudiced that they sincerely believe the falsehoods they tell.

When one lie doesn't work, the demagogue quickly moves on to more lies. Joe McCarthy first claimed to have "here in my hand" a list of 205 members of the Communist Party working in the State Department. Soon this became 57 "card-carrying Communists". When pressed to provide their names, McCarthy then said that while the records are not available to him, he knew "absolutely" that "approximately" 300 Communists were certified to the Secretary of State for discharge but only "approximately" 80 were actually discharged. When called on that bluff, he said that he had a list of 81, which he would use in the following weeks. McCarthy never turned up even one Communist in the State Department.

Emotional oratory and personal charisma
Many demagogues have demonstrated remarkable skill at moving audiences to great emotional depths and heights during a speech. Sometimes this is due to exceptional verbal eloquence, sometimes personal charisma, and sometimes both. Hitler demonstrated both. His eyes had a hypnotic effect on many people, seeming to immobilize and overwhelm whomever he glared at. Hitler usually began his speeches by speaking slowly, in a low, resonant voice, telling of his life in poverty after serving in World War I, suffering in the chaos and humiliation of postwar Germany, and resolving to reawaken the Fatherland. Gradually he would escalate the tone and tempo of his speech, ending in a climax in which he shrieked his hatred of Bolsheviks, Jews, Czechs, Poles, or whatever group he currently perceived as standing in his way—mocking them, ridiculing them, insulting them, and threatening them with destruction. Normally reasonable people became caught up in the peculiar rapport that Hitler established with his audience, believing even the most obvious lies and nonsense while under his spell. Hitler was not born with these vocal and oratorical skills; he acquired them through long and deliberate practice.

A more ordinary silver-tongued demagogue was the Negro-baiter James Kimble Vardaman (Governor of Mississippi 1904–1908, Senator 1913–1919), admired even by his opponents for his oratorical gifts and colorful language. An example, responding to Theodore Roosevelt's having invited black people to a reception at the White House: "Let Teddy take coons to the White House. I should not care if the walls of the ancient edifice should become so saturated with the effluvia from the rancid carcasses that a Chinch bug would have to crawl upon the dome to avoid asphyxiation." Vardaman's speeches tended to have little content; he spoke in a ceremonial style even in deliberative settings. His speeches served mostly as a vehicle for his personal magnetism, charming voice, and graceful delivery.

The demagogues' charisma and emotional oratory many times enabled them to win elections despite opposition from the press. The news media informs voters, and often the information is damaging to demagogues. Demagogic oratory distracts, entertains, and enthralls, steering followers' attention away from the demagogue's usual history of lies, abuses of power, and broken promises. The advent of radio enabled many 20th-century demagogues' skill with the spoken word to drown out the written word of newspapers.

Accusing opponents of weakness and disloyalty
Cleon of Athens, like many demagogues who came after him, constantly advocated brutality in order to demonstrate strength, and argued that compassion was a sign of weakness that would only be exploited by enemies. "It is a general rule of human nature that people despise those who treat them well and look up to those who make no concessions." At the Mytilenian Debate over whether to recall the ships he had sent the previous day to slaughter and enslave the entire population of Mytilene, he opposed the very idea of debate, characterizing it as an idle, weak, intellectual pleasure: "To feel pity, to be carried away by the pleasure of hearing a clever argument, to listen to the claims of decency are three things that are entirely against the interests of an imperial power."

Distracting from his lack of evidence for his claims, Joe McCarthy persistently insinuated that anyone who opposed him was a communist sympathizer. G.M. Gilbert summarized this rhetoric as "I'm agin' Communism; you're agin' me; therefore you must be a communist."

Promising the impossible
Another fundamental demagogic technique is making promises only for their emotional effect on audiences, without regard for how they might be accomplished or without intending to honor them once in office. Demagogues express these empty promises simply and theatrically, but remain extremely hazy about how they will achieve them because usually they are impossible. For example, Huey Long promised that if he were elected president, every family would have a home, an automobile, a radio, and $2,000 yearly. He was vague about how he would make that happen, but people still joined his Share-the-Wealth clubs. Another kind of empty demagogic promise is to make everyone wealthy or "solve all the problems". The Polish demagogue Stanisław Tymiński, running as an unknown "maverick" on the basis of his prior success as a businessman in Canada, promised "immediate prosperity"—exploiting the economic difficulties of laborers, especially miners and steelworkers. Tymiński forced a runoff in the 1990 presidential election, nearly defeating Lech Wałęsa.

 Violence and physical intimidation 
Demagogues have often encouraged their supporters to violently intimidate opponents, both to solidify loyalty among their supporters and to discourage or physically prevent people from speaking out or voting against them. "Pitchfork Ben" Tillman was repeatedly re-elected to the U.S. Senate largely through violence and intimidation. He spoke in support of lynch mobs, and he disenfranchised most black voters with the South Carolina constitution of 1895. Hitler wrote in Mein Kampf that physical intimidation was an effective way to move the masses. Hitler intentionally provoked hecklers at his rallies so that his supporters would become enraged by their remarks and assault them.

Personal insults and ridicule
Many demagogues have found that ridiculing or insulting opponents is a simple way to shut down reasoned deliberation of competing ideas, especially with an unsophisticated audience. "Pitchfork Ben" Tillman, for example, was a master of the personal insult. He got his nickname from a speech in which he called President Grover Cleveland "an old bag of beef" and resolved to bring a pitchfork to Washington to "poke him in his old fat ribs." James Kimble Vardaman consistently referred to President Theodore Roosevelt as a "coon-flavored miscegenationist" and once posted an ad in a newspaper for "sixteen big, fat, mellow, rancid coons" to sleep with Roosevelt during a trip to Mississippi.

A common demagogic technique is to pin an insulting epithet on an opponent, by saying it repeatedly, in speech after speech, when saying the opponent's name or in place of it. For example, James Curley referred to Henry Cabot Lodge Jr., his Republican opponent for Senator, as "Little Boy Blue". William Hale Thompson called Anton Cermak, his opponent for mayor of Chicago, "Tony Baloney". Huey Long called Joseph E. Ransdell, his elderly opponent for Senator, "Old Feather Duster". Joe McCarthy liked to call Secretary of State Dean Acheson "The Red Dean of Fashion". The use of epithets and other humorous invective diverts followers' attention from soberly considering how to address the important public issues of the time, scoring easy laughs instead.

Vulgarity and outrageous behavior
Legislative bodies usually have sober standards of decorum that are intended to quiet passions and favor reasoned deliberation. Many demagogues violate standards of decorum outrageously, to show clearly that they are thumbing their noses at the established order and the genteel ways of the upper class, or simply because they enjoy the attention that it brings. The common people might find the demagogue disgusting, but the demagogue can use the upper class's contempt for him to show that he won't be shamed or intimidated by the powerful.

For example, Huey Long famously wore pajamas to highly dignified occasions where others were dressed at the height of formality. He once stood "bukk nekkid" at his hotel suite when laying down the law to a meeting of political fuglemen. Long was "intensely and solely interested in himself. He had to dominate every scene he was in and every person around him. He craved attention and would go to almost any length to get it. He knew that an audacious action, although it was harsh and even barbarous, could shock people into a state where they could be manipulated." "He displayed no … restraint, proving so shameless in his pursuit of publicity, and so adept at getting press coverage, that he was soon attracting more attention from the press and the galleries than most of the rest of his colleagues combined."

Aristotle pointed out the bad manners of Cleon more than 2,000 years ago: "[Cleon] was the first who shouted on the public platform, who used abusive language and who spoke with his cloak girt about him, while all the others used to speak in proper dress and manner."

Folksy posturing
Most demagogues have made a show of appearing to be down-to-Earth, ordinary citizens just like the people whose votes they sought. In the United States, many took folksy nicknames: William H. Murray (1869–1956) was "Alfalfa Bill"; James M. Curley (1874–1958) of Boston was "Our Jim"; Ellison D. Smith (1864–1944) was "Cotton Ed"; the husband-and-wife demagogue team of Miriam and James E. Ferguson went by "Ma and Pa"; Texas governor W. Lee O'Daniel (1890–1969) was "Pappy-Pass-the-Biscuits".

Georgia governor Eugene Talmadge (1884–1946)  put a barn and a henhouse on the Executive Mansion grounds, loudly explaining that he couldn't sleep nights unless he heard the bellowing of livestock and the cackling of poultry. When in the presence of farmers, he chewed tobacco and faked a rural accent—though he himself was college-educated—railing against "frills" and "nigger-lovin' furriners". He defined furriner as "Anyone who attempts to impose ideas that are contrary to the established traditions of Georgia." His grammar and vocabulary became more refined when speaking before a city audience. Talmadge was famous for wearing gaudy red galluses, which he snapped for emphasis during his speeches. On his desk, he kept three books, which he loudly proclaimed to visitors were all that a governor needed: a bible, the state financial report, and a Sears–Roebuck catalog.

Huey Long displayed his common-people roots by such methods as calling himself "The Kingfish" and gulping down pot likker when visiting northern Louisiana; he once issued a press release demanding that his name be removed from the Washington Social Register. "Alfalfa Bill" made sure to remind people of his rural background by talking in the terminology of farming: "I will plow straight furrows and blast all the stumps. The common people and I can lick the whole lousy gang."

Gross oversimplification
Demagogues commonly treat complex problems, which require patient reasoning and analysis, as if they result from one simple cause or can be solved by one simple cure. For example, Huey Long claimed that all of the U.S.'s economic problems could be solved just by "sharing the wealth". Hitler claimed that Germany had lost World War I only because of a "Stab in the Back". Scapegoating (above) is one form of gross oversimplification.

Attacking the news media
Since information from the press can undermine a demagogue's spell over his or her followers, modern demagogues have often attacked it intemperately, calling for violence against newspapers who opposed them, claiming that the press was secretly in the service of moneyed interests or foreign powers, or claiming that leading newspapers were simply personally out to get them. Huey Long accused the New Orleans Times–Picayune and Item of being "bought", and had his bodyguards rough up their reporters. Oklahoma governor "Alfalfa Bill" Murray (1869–1956) once called for a bomb to be dropped on the offices of the Daily Oklahoman. Joe McCarthy accused The Christian Science Monitor, the New York Post, The New York Times, the New York Herald Tribune, The Washington Post, the St. Louis Post-Dispatch, and other leading American newspapers of being "Communist smear sheets" under the control of the Kremlin.

Demagogues in power

Establishing one-man rule, subverting the rule of law
Once elected to executive office, most demagogues have moved quickly to expand their power, both de jure and de facto: by getting legislation passed to officially expand their authority, and by building up networks of corruption and informal pressure to ensure that their dictates are followed regardless of constitutional authority.

For example, within two months of being appointed chancellor, Hitler unraveled all constitutional limitations on his power. He achieved this through near-daily acts of chaos, destabilizing the state and providing ever stronger reasons to justify taking more power. Hitler was appointed on January 30, 1933; on February 1, the Reichstag was dissolved; on February 27, the Reichstag building burned; on February 28, the Reichstag Fire Decree gave Hitler emergency powers and suspended civil liberties; on March 5, new general elections were held; on March 22, the first concentration camp opened, taking political prisoners. On March 24, the Enabling Act was passed, giving Hitler full legislative powers, thus ending all constitutional restraint and making Hitler absolute dictator. Consolidation of power continued even after that; see Early timeline of Nazism.

Even local demagogues have established one-man rule, or a near approximation of it, over their constituencies. "Alfalfa Bill" Murray, a demagogue who was elected governor of Oklahoma by appealing to poor rural animosity toward "craven wolves of plutocracy", promised to "make an open season on millionaires." Despite having presided over Oklahoma's constitutional convention, Murray routinely violated the constitution, ruling by executive order whenever the legislature or the courts got in his way. When federal courts ruled against him, he prevailed by relying on the National Guard, even donning a military hat and pistol and personally commanding the troops—and seeing to it that the confrontation was filmed by movie cameras. Murray attempted to expand gubernatorial powers with a set of four initiatives, replacing existing income-tax law with his own, giving him power to appoint all members of the board of education, acquiring corporation-owned land, and giving him extraordinary power over the budget, but these were defeated.

Appointing unqualified lackeys to high office; corruption
As the preceding section illustrates, demagogues typically appoint people to high office based on personal loyalty without regard to competence for the office—opening up extraordinary avenues for graft and corruption. During "Alfalfa Bill" Murray's campaign for governor, he promised to crack down on corruption and favoritism for the rich, to abolish half the clerk jobs at the State House, to appoint no family members, to reduce the number of state-owned cars from 800 to 200, never to use convict labor to compete with commercial labor, and not to abuse the power of pardon. Once in office, he appointed wealthy patrons and 20 of his relatives to high office, purchased more cars, used prisoners to make ice for sale and clean the capitol building, and violated all the other promises. When the State Auditor pointed out that 1,050 new employees had been added to the state payroll, Murray simply said, "Just damned lies." For each abuse of power, Murray claimed a mandate from "the sovereign will of the people".

Famous historical demagogues

Ancient
Cleon
The Athenian leader Cleon is known as a notorious demagogue mainly because of three events described in the writings of Thucydides and Aristophanes.

First, after the failed revolt by the city of Mytilene, Cleon persuaded the Athenians to slaughter not just the Mytilenean prisoners, but every man in the city, and to sell their wives and children as slaves. The Athenians rescinded the resolution the following day when they came to their senses.

Second, after Athens had completely defeated the Peloponnesian fleet in the Battle of Sphacteria and Sparta could only beg for peace on almost any terms, Cleon persuaded the Athenians to reject the peace offer.

Third, he taunted the Athenian generals over their failure to bring the war in Sphacteria to a rapid close, accusing them of cowardice, and declared that he could finish the job himself in twenty days, despite having no military knowledge. They gave him the job, expecting him to fail. Cleon shrank at being called to make good on his boast, and tried to get out of it, but he was forced to take the command. In fact, he succeeded—by getting the general Demosthenes to do it, now treating him with respect after previously slandering him behind his back. Three years later, Cleon and his Spartan counterpart Brasidas were killed at the Battle of Amphipolis, enabling a restoration of peace that lasted until the outbreak of the Second Peloponnesian War.

Modern commentators suspect that Thucydides and Aristophanes exaggerated the vileness of Cleon's real character. Both had personal conflicts with Cleon, and The Knights is a satirical, allegorical comedy that doesn't even mention Cleon by name. Cleon was a tradesman—a leather-tanner. Thucydides and Aristophanes came from the upper classes, predisposed to look down on the commercial classes. Nevertheless, their portrayals define the archetypal example of the "demagogue" or "rabble-rouser."

Alcibiades
Alcibiades convinced the people of Athens to attempt to conquer Sicily during the Peloponnesian War, with disastrous results. He led the Athenian assembly to support making him commander by claiming victory would come easily, appealing to Athenian vanity, and appealing to action and courage over deliberation. Alcibiades's expedition might have succeeded if he had not been denied command by the political maneuvers of his rivals.

Gaius Flaminius
Gaius Flaminius was a Roman consul most known for being defeated by Hannibal at the Battle of Lake Trasimene during the second Punic war. Hannibal was able to make pivotal decisions during this battle because he understood his opponent. Flaminius was described as a demagogue by Polybius, in his book The Histories "...Flaminius possessed a rare talent for the arts of demagogy..." Because Flaminius was thus ill-suited, he lost 15,000 Roman lives, his own included, in the battle.

Modern

Adolf Hitler

The most famous demagogue of modern history, Adolf Hitler, first attempted to overthrow the Bavarian government not with popular support but by force in a failed putsch in 1923. While in prison, Hitler chose a new strategy: to overthrow the government democratically, by cultivating a mass movement. Even before the putsch, Hitler had rewritten the Nazi party's platform to consciously target the lower classes of Germany, appealing to their resentment of wealthier classes and calling for German unity and increased central power. Hitler was delighted by the instant increase in popularity.

While Hitler was in prison, the Nazi party vote had fallen to one million, and it continued to fall after Hitler was released in 1924 and began rejuvenating the party. For the next several years, Hitler and the Nazi party were generally regarded as a laughingstock in Germany, no longer taken seriously as a threat to the country. The prime minister of Bavaria lifted the region's ban on the party, saying, "The wild beast is checked. We can afford to loosen the chain."

In 1929, with the start of the Great Depression, Hitler's populism started to become effective. Hitler updated the Nazi party's platform to exploit the economic distress of ordinary Germans: repudiating the Versailles Treaty, promising to eliminate corruption, and pledging to provide every German with a job. In 1930, the Nazi party went from 200,000 votes to 6.4 million, making it the second-largest party in Parliament. By 1932, the Nazi party had become the largest in Parliament. In early 1933, Hitler was appointed Chancellor. He then exploited the Reichstag fire to arrest his political opponents and consolidate his control of the army. Within a few years, exploiting democratic support of the masses, Hitler took Germany from a democracy to a total dictatorship.

Huey Long

Huey Long, nicknamed "The Kingfish", was an American politician who served as the 40th governor of Louisiana from 1928 to 1932 and as a member of the United States Senate from 1932 until his assassination in 1935. He was a populist member of the Democratic Party and rose to national prominence during the Great Depression for his vocal criticism from the left of President Franklin D. Roosevelt and his New Deal. As the political leader of Louisiana, he commanded wide networks of supporters and often took forceful action. A controversial figure, Long is celebrated as a populist benefactor or conversely denounced as a fascist demagogue.

In 1928, before Long was sworn in as governor of Louisiana, he was already supervising political appointments to ensure a loyal majority for all his initiatives. As governor, he ousted public officers not personally loyal to him and took control away from state commissions to ensure that all contracts would be awarded to people in his political machine. In a confrontation over natural gas with managers of the Public Service Corporation, he told them, truthfully, "A deck has 52 cards and in Baton Rouge I hold all 52 of them and I can shuffle and deal as I please. I can have bills passed or I can kill them. I'll give you until Saturday to decide." They yielded to Long—and became part of his ever-expanding machine.

When Long became a senator in 1932, his enemy, the lieutenant governor Paul N. Cyr, was sworn in as governor. Long, without authority, ordered state troopers to surround the executive mansion and arrest Cyr as an imposter. Long installed his ally Alvin O. King as governor, later replaced by O.K. Allen, serving as stooges for Long. Thus even in Washington, with no official authority, Long retained dictatorial control over Louisiana. When the Mayor of New Orleans, T. Semmes Walmsley, began to oppose Long's extraordinary power over the state, Long exploited a subservient judge to justify making an armed attack on the basis of cracking down on racketeering. At Long's order, Governor Allen declared martial law and dispatched National Guardsmen to seize the Registrar of Voters, allegedly "to prevent election frauds." Then, by stuffing ballot boxes, Long ensured victory for his candidates to Congress. Long's own racketeering operation then grew. With his "trained seal" legislature, armed militias, taxation used as a political weapon, control over elections, and weakened court authority to limit his power, Huey Long maintained control in Louisiana comparable to that of Hitler in Germany or Stalin in the Soviet Union.

Joseph McCarthy
Joseph McCarthyWicker, Tom, Shooting Star: the Brief Arc of Joe McCarthy, Houghton Mifflin Harcourt (2006) "Joe McCarthy may have been the most destructive demagogue in American history." p. 5"McCarthy's Senate colleagues voted sixty-seven to twenty-two to censure him for his reckless accusations and fabrications." back cover was a U.S. Senator from the state of Wisconsin from 1947 to 1957. Though a poor orator, McCarthy rose to national prominence during the early 1950s by proclaiming that high places in the United States federal government and military were "infested" with communists, contributing to the second "Red Scare". Ultimately his inability to provide proof for his claims, as well as his public attacks on the United States Army, led to the Army–McCarthy hearings in 1954, which in turn led to his censure by the Senate and fall from popularity.

 Good demagoguery 

 Tactical demagoguery 
Some scholars have challenged the consensus that demagoguery is necessarily a bad form of leadership and rhetoric. In Demagogues in American Politics, for example, Charles U. Zug argues that demagoguery can be legitimate and even good if integrated into a broader strategy for political reform and if coupled with a robust rationale for political change. Zug contrasts classical or traditional approaches to demagoguery, which assume that demagogues are motivated by vicious intentions (such as an unrestrained desire for power), with a modern approach that focuses on the external words and deeds that demagogues use to advance political goals. Relatedly, as Princeton Classicist Melissa Lane has argued, in pre-Socratic antiquity demagogues were originally viewed as neither inherently good nor inherently bad, but rather as advocates for the common people (as opposed to the oligarchs). Zug has argued that conceiving of demagoguery as an inherently negative practice incentivizes political actors to weaponize the label "demagogue"; as a consequence, otherwise innocent victims--such as the supposed leader of Shays' Rebellion, Daniel Shays--can be inaccurately branded as vicious, unscrupulous leaders. 

 Demagoguery in constitutional office 
Zug also argues that demagoguery takes on different meanings when deployed by public officials in different institutions; for example, American federal judges should be scrutinized more carefully for using demagoguery than should legislators, since the act of judging well--i.e., adjudicating legal disputes--does not require direct appeals to the public. In contract, being an effective member of Congress requires advocating for a constituency and getting (re)elected; and these responsibilities in turn require direct public appeals, and sometimes, demagoguery.

See also

 Authoritarianism
 Big lie
 Charismatic authority
 Cleophon
 Cult of personality
 Demades
 Firehosing
 Hyperbolus
 It Can't Happen Here Lachares
 Majoritarianism
 Narcissistic leadership
 Ochlocracy
 Social dominance orientation
 Strongman (politics)
 Toxic leader

References
Notes

Further reading
 
 
 
 
 Zug, Charles U. (2022). Demagogues in American Politics''. New York: Oxford University Press. ISBN 978-0197651957.

External links
 
 
 

Propaganda techniques
Populism
Political terminology